Lasse Günther (born 21 March 2003) is a German professional footballer who plays as a winger for 2. Bundesliga club Jahn Regensburg, on loan from FC Augsburg.

Career
Günther made his professional debut for Bayern Munich II in the 3. Liga on 10 April 2021, coming on as a substitute in the 62nd minute for Nicolas-Gerrit Kühn against FC Ingolstadt. The away match finished as a 2–2 draw.

In May 2021, Günther transferred back to his former club FC Augsburg, and signed a contract until June 2025.

In August 2022, he was loaned to SSV Jahn Regensburg for one season.

References

External links
 
 
 
 

2003 births
Living people
German footballers
Germany youth international footballers
Association football wingers
Bundesliga players
3. Liga players
FC Bayern Munich II players
FC Augsburg players
SSV Jahn Regensburg players
21st-century German people